Guetta is a Jewish surname common in France and Israel. It was also a common Venetian Jewish surname , and the family bore its own crest.

People with the name
Notable people with the surname include:

 Bernard Guetta (born 1951), French politician
 Cathy Guetta (born 1967), French socialite
 David Guetta (born 1967), French DJ, record producer and songwriter
 Eliran Guetta (born 1975), Israeli basketball player
 Yigal Guetta (born 1966), Israeli politician

Other forms
Variants of the Jewish surname include Gueta, Guita, Guitta, Quita. It may be derived from three sources: the Goeta tribe of western Libya; Guete, ancient name of the Castilian town of Huete (Huepte); a nickname derived from the Arabic word for "sharp/cutting/piercing". See
 Tzuri Gueta (b. 1968), Israeli jewelry and fabric designer
 Snir Gueta (b. 1988), retired Israeli professional footballer
Guitta, nickname of Thiago Mendes Rocha (born, 1987), Brazilian futsal player

See also
Muisca, a pre-Columbian people of today's Colombia, used the word gueta
 Muisca numerals: gueta = 20
 Muisca calendar

References